Soul in the Hole is the soundtrack album to the 1997 film of the same name. It was released through Loud Records on July 29, 1997. It peaked at number 73 on the Billboard 200 chart and number 13 on the Top R&B/Hip-Hop Albums chart.

Critical reception
In 2012, Complex placed it at number 20 on the "25 Best Hip-Hop Movie Soundtracks of All Time" list.

Track listing

Charts

References

External links

1997 soundtrack albums
Hip hop soundtracks
Loud Records soundtracks
Relativity Records soundtracks
Albums produced by RZA
Albums produced by Melvin "Mel-Man" Bradford
Albums produced by No I.D.
Albums produced by DJ Premier
Albums produced by Havoc (musician)
Documentary film soundtracks